The Minister for the Arts is a Minister of the Crown in the New South Wales Government who has responsibilities for the administration and support for the arts in the state of New South Wales, Australia. The portfolio was abolished in 2019 and merged into the portfolio of Minister for the Public Service and Employee Relations, Aboriginal Affairs, and the Arts; and reinstated in December 2021.

The current Minister for the Arts is Ben Franklin, who also serves as the Minister for Aboriginal Affairs and as the Minister for Regional Youth, appointed with effect from 21 December 2021. The minister assists the lead portfolio minister, the Minister for Enterprise, Investment and Trade, Alister Henskens who was appointed with effect from 5 August 2022. Together the ministers administer the portfolio through Create NSW (formerly Arts NSW) within the Department of Enterprise, Investment and Trade, as well as a range of additional government agencies.

Ultimately, the minister is responsible to the Parliament of New South Wales.

Office history
The role of an 'arts' minister, overseeing the management and support for all cultural activities in New South Wales, before the early 1970s was an unheard of concept in politics. However, by the early 1970s, various governments in Australia recognised the need for a steering authority for state support for the arts. In response, premier Bob Askin appointed George Freudenstein as the first Minister for Cultural Activities+ on 11 March 1971. This coincided with the appointment of the first federal minister with a responsibility for the arts on 10 March and a Minister for Cultural Affairs in Western Australia on 3 March 1971. Premier of Victoria Rupert Hamer commissioned himself with a ministry of the arts in 1972 and South Australia followed suit on 18 September 1979.

On his appointment Freudenstein requested the establishment of an organisation to enable him to carry out his responsibilities and the Premier agreed. On 13 May 1971 the "Ministry of Cultural Activities" was established, taking over responsibility for various legislation and bodies that had previously been under the purview of the Department of Education, including the Archives Office of New South Wales, Art Gallery of New South Wales, State Library of New South Wales, Australian Museum, Museum of Applied Arts and Sciences, Sydney Observatory, the Advisory Committee on Cultural Grants, NSW Film Council, and the Sydney Opera House Trust. In the case of the opera house, the Ministry had responsibility for its completion and final official opening on 20 October 1973. With Freudenstein's departure on 3 January 1975, a new Minister for Culture, Sport and Recreation was appointed and on 6 January 1975, the Ministry of Cultural Activities was replaced by the new "Department of Culture, Sport and Recreation".

This arrangement lasted until 14 May 1976 when the new Labor Government of Neville Wran transferred the responsibility for cultural activities to the Premier's Department. This became the "Cultural Activities Division" under the administration of the Premier himself. This situation continued until 1984, when Wran established the "Office of the Minister for the Arts" within the Premier's Department and commissioned himself with the title of Minister for the Arts. On 15 June 1988 a "Ministry for the Arts" independent of the Premier's Department was established. This ministry was abolished on 3 March 2006 and its responsibilities were moved to the new "Department of the Arts, Sport and Recreation". Arts NSW became the new dedicated division for the Minister and it transferred to "Communities NSW" in July 2009 and then the "Department of Trade and Investment, Regional Infrastructure and Services" from 4 April 2011. From the appointment of Troy Grant as the minister in 2014 (who also served as Minister for Justice and Police), Arts NSW came within the Justice Department.

Following the 2019 state election the portfolio responsibilities were transferred to the Premier and Cabinet cluster, with Create NSW (formerly Arts NSW) administered through the Department of Premier and Cabinet, a department of the Government of New South Wales. In December 2021, the portfolio responsibilities and Create NSW were transferred to the new Department of Enterprise, Investment and Trade.

List of ministers

Assistant Ministers

See also 

List of New South Wales government agencies

References

Arts
1971 establishments in Australia